
The Chinese Ambassador to Singapore is the official representative of the People's Republic of China to the Republic of Singapore.

List of representatives to British Singapore

List of representatives to the Republic of Singapore

See also
 China–Singapore relations
 Singapore Ambassador to China

References 

 
Singapore
China